An Instagram husband is an unacknowledged photographer who composes social media posts for someone else, usually a romantic partner. On Instagram, a photo-sharing social networking service known for carefully curated posts and elaborately staged amateur photo shoots, an Instagram husband is the individual who operates the camera at the direction of the photo's subject. With the rise of social media influencer culture, the quotidian task of taking photos for a partner or friend, for some, escalates into an obligation similar to a job. The term "husband" is used without regard to gender or sexual orientation.

The concept was introduced by a 2015 viral video that joked at the misery of men reluctantly assisting their partners in unending, impromptu photo shoots to share on social media. Since then, some of those types of social media creators have professionalized as "influencers", earning an income by influencing their social media followings. Accordingly, some professionalized Instagram husbands have adopted the moniker while joining in their partner's business.

See also 

 Invisible labor

References

Further reading 

 
 
 
 
 
 
 
 
 
 
 

Celebrities in popular culture
Social media influencers
Instagram
Labor
Intimate relationships